William Henry Jones (20 December 1920 – 30 July 1986) was an Australian rules footballer who played with Fitzroy in the Victorian Football League (VFL).

Notes

External links 

1920 births
1986 deaths
Australian rules footballers from Victoria (Australia)
Fitzroy Football Club players